Galegine is a toxic chemical compound that has been isolated from Goat's rue (Galega officinalis).  It has also been found to be the principal cause of the toxicity of poison sedge (Schoenus asperocarpus).

Galegine was used in the 1920s as a pharmaceutical treatment for diabetes; however, because of its toxicity, its use was soon supplanted by superior alternatives. Research on galegine eventually led to the development of metformin which is used today for treatment of type 2 diabetes.

See also
 Nitensidine D

References

Guanidine alkaloids
Plant toxins